The West Jordan Ward Meetinghouse, at 1140 W. 7800 South in West Jordan, Utah, was designed and built in 1867 by Elias Morris as a Mormon meetinghouse, in a style that was later termed a "first-phase meetinghouse".  Since also known as D.U.P. Pioneer Hall, it includes Classical Revival.  As of 1995, it was historically significant as the sole remaining church and public building in West Jordan.

It was listed on the National Register of Historic Places in 1995.

References

Churches on the National Register of Historic Places in Utah
Neoclassical architecture in Utah
Buildings and structures completed in 1867
Buildings and structures in West Jordan, Utah
1867 establishments in Utah Territory
National Register of Historic Places in Salt Lake County, Utah